Växjö DFF is a football club from Växjö, in Kronoberg County, Sweden. The club was established in 2014 and was promoted into the Women's Premier Division (Damallsvenskan) for the first time in 2017.

The club play their home games at Myresjöhus Arena in Växjö. The team colour is black. The club is affiliated to the Smålands Fotbollförbund.

In 2021, Växjö DFF was relegated from Damallsvenskan after losing an away game, 0–5, to Linköpings FC on Thursday, 14 Ocktober.

Current squad

Former players
For details of current and former players, see :Category:Växjö DFF players.

Honours
Elitettan (Tier 2)
Winners: 2017

Footnotes

External links
 Växjö DFF – Official website 

Women's football clubs in Sweden
Sport in Växjö
2014 establishments in Sweden
Damallsvenskan teams
Association football clubs established in 2014